The House at 23 East Street in Methuen, Massachusetts is a well preserved Greek Revival cottage.  Built in c. 1840, it is a -story three bay wood-frame structure with a side hall entry and a front-facing gable end.  The main entrance is flanked by full-length sidelight windows and topped by a transom window.  Houses similar to this were generally occupied by craftsmen such as boot-, shoe-, and hatmakers.  Before large-scale industrialization they were scattered throughout the town.

The house was listed on the National Register of Historic Places in 1984.

See also
 National Register of Historic Places listings in Methuen, Massachusetts
 National Register of Historic Places listings in Essex County, Massachusetts

References

Houses in Methuen, Massachusetts
National Register of Historic Places in Methuen, Massachusetts
Houses on the National Register of Historic Places in Essex County, Massachusetts
Greek Revival architecture in Massachusetts